DNA dC->dU-editing enzyme APOBEC-3F is a protein that in humans is encoded by the APOBEC3F gene.

This gene is a member of the cytidine deaminase gene family. It is one of seven related genes or pseudogenes found in a cluster, thought to result from gene duplication, on chromosome 22. Members of the cluster encode proteins that are structurally and functionally related to the C to U RNA-editing cytidine deaminase APOBEC1. It is thought that the proteins may be RNA editing enzymes and have roles in growth or cell cycle control. Alternatively spliced transcript variants encoding different isoforms have been identified.

References

Human APOBEC3F is another host factor that blocks human immunodeficiency virus type 1 replication.
Zheng YH, Irwin D, Kurosu T, Tokunaga K, Sata T, Peterlin BM.
J Virol. 2004 Jun;78(11):6073-6. doi: 10.1128/JVI.78.11.6073-6076.2004.

External links

Further reading

EC 3.5.4